The Moth and the Mountain: A True Story of Love, War, and Everest is a 2020 book by Ed Caesar that examines Maurice Wilson. The book has five "positive" reviews, six "rave" reviews, and one "mixed" review, according to review aggregator Book Marks.

References

2020 non-fiction books
English-language books
Avid Reader Press books
British biographies
Mountaineering books
Mount Everest